Milesia virginiensis, known generally as the yellowjacket hover fly or Virginia flower fly, is a species of hoverfly in the family Syrphidae.

It measures 18-21 mm. It lives in forest edges and meadows. Adults are active mid summer to early fall.

Distribution
United States, Ontario Canada. Mexico

References

Eristalinae
Insects described in 1773
Taxa named by Dru Drury
Diptera of North America
Hoverflies of North America